Bruno Toledo (born 23 November 1973) is a Spanish retired long-distance runner who specialized in the 10,000 metres.

Achievements

Personal bests
1500 metres - 3:38.7 min (1998) 
3000 metres - 7:44.17 min (1998) 
5000 metres - 13:25.40 min (1998) 
10,000 metres - 27:43.29 min (1998)

References

1973 births
Living people
Spanish male long-distance runners